Amer Deeb Mohammad Khalil (born 4 February 1980) is a retired Jordanian football player, of Palestinian origin.
 
Amer is married and has two children, a son named Qusai and a daughter named Bayan.

To many fans of Jordan and Al-Wahdat, he is referred to as "Deeb of Jordan" and "Deeb of Al-Wahdat" (ذيب الأردن وذيب الوحدات), by his last name.

Honors and participation in International Tournaments

In AFC Asian Cups 
2004 Asian Cup
2011 Asian Cup

In Arab Nations Cup 
2002 Arab Nations Cup

In WAFF Championships 
2002 WAFF Championship
2004 WAFF Championship
2007 WAFF Championship
2008 WAFF Championship
2010 WAFF Championship

International goals
Scores and results list Jordan's goal tally first.

International career statistics

See also
List of men's footballers with 100 or more international caps

References

External links
 Amer Deeb: Jordan Will Be Hard to Beat
 Emirates SC Officially Includes Amer Deeb
 Amer Deeb Terminates His Contract With Al-Wahdat SC to play in Al-Faisaly (KSA) 
 Amer Deeb: "I Did Not Ask for a Fil From Al-Wahdat SC...And There are Those Who are Trying to Rebel"  
 Amer Deeb: "I Will Sign for Al-Yarmouk FC and I Apologize to the Fans of Al-Wahdat SC"
 Jordanian Amer Deeb Takes Professionalism in Ittihad Kalba' of the UAE for 1/4 of a Million Dollars 
 Amer Deeb: "We Have Compacted to Return for Achievements...And We Will Fight In Hopes of Qualifying for the World Cup" 
 Amer Deeb: "Our Battle With Japan is the Most Important for Jordan" 
 Amer Deeb Officially Returns to Al-Wahdat SC, for $40,000 
 Amer Deeb: "Hidden Hands Have Taken Me Away From Al-Wahdat SC... Let's Turn the Page of the Past and Focus on the Present!"

External links
 
 
 
 
 

1980 births
Living people
Sportspeople from Amman
Jordanian footballers
2004 AFC Asian Cup players
2011 AFC Asian Cup players
Jordanian people of Palestinian descent
Al-Yarmouk FC (Jordan) players
Al-Faisaly FC players
Al-Wehdat SC players
Emirates Club players
Al-Ittihad Kalba SC players
FIFA Century Club
Jordanian Pro League players
Saudi Professional League players
UAE Pro League players
UAE First Division League players
Association football defenders
Jordan international footballers
Jordanian expatriate footballers
Jordanian expatriate sportspeople in Saudi Arabia
Jordanian expatriate sportspeople in the United Arab Emirates
Expatriate footballers in Saudi Arabia
Expatriate footballers in the United Arab Emirates